Angelo Campanella (born c. 1748 – c. 1815) was an Italian painter and engraver. Born in Rome, he trained under Giovanni Volpato. He engraved the statues of twelve apostles found in the church of St. John Lateran; and some of the plates for Gavin Hamilton's Schola Itálica, including The Presentation in the Temple after Fra Bartolommeo. Other engravings include Christ with the Disciples at Emmaus, The Massacre of the Innocents, and Psyche and Cupid after Raphael.

References

18th-century Italian painters
Italian male painters
19th-century Italian painters
Italian engravers
1748 births
1815 deaths
19th-century Italian male artists
18th-century Italian male artists